Amarilis may refer to:

People
 Amarilis (poet), a 16th-century Peruvian poet
 Amarilis (actor), an American actor
 Amarilis Fuentes, an Ecuadorean teacher and suffragist
 Amarilis Savón, a Cuban judoka
 Amarilis de Varennes, a Portuguese professor
 Amarilis Villar, a Venezuelan volleyball player

Places
 Amarilis District, a district in Huánuco, Peru

See also
Amaryllis, a genus of flowering bulbs